Phlox caespitosa is a species of phlox known by the common name tufted phlox. It is native to western North America from British Columbia through the Great Basin to New Mexico, where it grows in scrub, woodland, and other open plateau habitat. It is one of several cushion-forming species that occur in the same region and require careful observation to distinguish. In the past, this species and Phlox douglasii have been erroneously lumped together.

Description
It is a mat-forming perennial herb growing in patches of short, hairy, glandular stems. The stems are lined with pairs of very narrow, sharp-tipped linear leaves each under a centimeter in length. The inflorescence is a solitary flower or cluster of up to three flowers at the tip of each stem. The flower is white or light pink or lavender with five rounded lobes. It is around a centimeter long.

References

External links
Jepson Manual Treatment
Photo gallery

caespitosa
Flora of North America